Gautampur   is a village development committee in Sunsari District in the Koshi Zone of south-eastern Nepal. It has neighbouring villages called Ramnagar (popularly known as Bhutaha) in the west, Harinagra in the south whereas Jalpapur village also  lies in the North Direction respectively but nowadays jalpapur is merged into Inaruwa Municipality . At the time of the 1991 Nepal census it had a population of 3193 people living in 545 individual households.

References

Populated places in Sunsari District